John Rose Murray (19 December 1898 - 2 May 1991) was a Ceylonese accountant and politician in Colonial Ceylon.

John Rose Murray was born on 19 December 1898 in Edinburgh, Midlothian, the youngest of four children of John Rose Murray,  engine fitter, and Helen née McLeod, domestic servant.

In September 1929 he married Hilda Beatrice Cooper (1911-2015). They had four children: John Telfer McLeod (b.1929), a daughter and two other sons.

In May 1947 they travelled to Ceylon on board the RMS Scythia from Liverpool.

A chartered accountant of the Institute of Chartered Accountants of Scotland, he was appointed as a member of House of Representatives of Ceylon on 6 June 1952, serving until his resignation in March 1958.

Murray was the Chairman of the Ceylon Chamber of Commerce on several occasions between 1950 and 1955.

He died on 2 May 1991 at Taunton Deane, Somerset, and he was buried in Comely Bank Cemetery, Edinburgh.

References 

1898 births
People from British Ceylon
Sri Lankan accountants
Scottish accountants
Sri Lankan people of English descent
Members of the 2nd Parliament of Ceylon
Members of the 3rd Parliament of Ceylon
1991 deaths
20th-century Scottish businesspeople